The Husum–Kiel railway is a main line railway in the German state of Schleswig-Holstein. While the central section of the line, which is shared with the Neumünster–Flensburg line, has two tracks and is electrified, its western and eastern sections are single track and are not electrified. It connects the cities of Husum and Kiel via Rendsburg and serves as an important east-west rail axis between the North Sea and the Baltic Sea.

Historically, the line ran from Husum to Kiel via Erfde and Rendsburg. The current line runs via Jübek, Schleswig and Rendsburg, with the Jübek–Rendsburg section being shared with the Neumünster–Flensburg line. The line was opened in 1854 and is one of the oldest railways in Germany.

Route

The line begins in the third Husum station, which was opened in 1910 for the line to Erfde and Rendsburg. This station is the main hub of the North Sea coast of Schleswig-Holstein. In addition to the trains to and from Kiel it is served by the trains of the Marsh Railway and the Husum–Bad St. Peter-Ording line. The line runs to Kiel through flat geest lands to the northeast and reaches the Mühlenbach stream in Ohrstedt. There are no stations until Jübek.

Several stations along the line were abandoned in the early 1980s and are only served by freight trains. From Jübek the line runs over the Neumünster–Flensburg line. The line runs through flat, mostly agricultural land to Schleswig station, continuing through hilly moraines to Rendsburg. Train do not stop in Büdelsdorf, where there was a connection, until 1974, to the original line from Husum to Rendsburg via Erfde, which opened on 1 September 1910.

Rendsburg station was not moved when the Kiel Canal was built. Instead the great Rendsburg Loop was built around part of the city to connect it to the Rendsburg High Bridge over the canal. The line branched from Osterrönfeld station to Kiel until the line was diverted further east on 15 October 1904. In Felde, the line crosses the Eider river, which flows into the Kiel Canal nearby. The line reaches the Kiel–Flensburg line and then the Hamburg-Altona–Kiel line just before the entrance to Kiel Hauptbahnhof.

History

Husum-Erfde-Rendsburg 
On 1 September 1910, a 50 km-long direct Husum–Erfde–Rendsburg line opened. It ran from Husum, crossed the lower Treene river to Norderstapel and ran via Erfde to Rendsburg and then continued on the current route to Kiel. The line crossed the Schleswig District Railway's line between Friedrichstadt and Schleswig in Norderstapel until 1934.

In the late 1920s, there were continuous passenger services on the Husum–Erfde–Rendsburg–Kiel route, with a total running time of about three hours. A few faster services on the route took about two hours and 20 minutes. In 1959, motor coaches on the route to Rendsburg took about 70 minutes. Local trains on the Husum–Kiel route continued to operate via Erfde, while express trains were already running via Jübek. About eight pairs of trains operated daily.

On 25 May 1974, passenger services were closed from Husum to Rendsburg via Erfde. At the same time the freight operations were discontinued on the section on the line between Erfde and Hohn. The line was dismantled afterwards. The continuous link was thus reduced to freight-only sections between Husum and Erfde and between Rendsburg and Hohn. These sections were further shortened in the following decades, piece by piece. One reason for the closures was the marshy ground in the middle part of the line. Since then, all trains from Husum to Kiel run via Jübek, Schleswig and Rendsburg, which means a detour of about 12 km.

The route has now been largely dismantled. On 28 May 1988, freight transport between Fockbek and Hohn was closed. About 2.5 km long of the line between Rendsburg station and a northern industrial area remains, but it is also now unused. The Husum– Erfde line was closed to freight to Erfde on 24 September 1988, Schwabstedt on 27 May 1989 and to Mildstedt on 22 May 1993. It continued to operate as a siding to a timber mill in Mildstedt until 2003.

Husum-Jübek 
Most of this 26 km line was built as part of the Flensburg–Husum–Tönning line, completed by the Flensburg-Husum-Tönningen Railway Company (Flensburg-Husum-Tönninger Eisenbahngesellschaft, FHTE) on 25 October 1854, for, among other things, the transportation of cattle to Great Britain. The FHTE also opened on 25 October 1854 a line from Ohrstedt to Rendsburg via Owschlag, running to the west of the city of Schleswig. After the Second Schleswig War of 1864, the Duchy of Schleswig was annexed by Prussia and the northeastern section of the line from Husum to Flensburg was diverted to run from Sollbrück (near Ohrstedt) to Jübek, rather than to Eggebek. This line was opened on 29 December 1869 and created a route between Husum and Neumünster, which had the advantage of running via Schleswig and maximised the use of the Neumünster–Flensburg line. The old route from Ohrstedt to Owschlag was closed at the same time.

Jübek–Rendsburg 
This shares the middle part of the Neumünster–Flensburg line.

Rendsburg–Kiel 
 
This section was opened on 15 October 1904 by the Prussian State Railways. Passenger services were mostly provided by local trains. Already in the late 1920s, some through trains ran to Husum, some of which made a few stops only. Later, three to four pairs of fast trains regularly ran on the route, including a pair of Husum–Lübeck trains. After the closure of the Niebüll-Flensburg line in 1980, a pair of trains run seasonally as the Sylter Welle from Kiel (sometimes also from Lübeck) to Westerland) via Jübek instead of Flensburg. This train ran in 2005 for the last time and was the last locomotive-hauled passenger train on the line.

The newest station was opened between Rendsburg and Kiel at Mettenhof in the early 1970s to serve a satellite settlement of Kiel. In 1984 all stops between Rendsburg and Kiel were closed.  In 1987, regional fast trains (Regionalschnellbahnen) were introduced on the line. Felde station (formerly Brandsbek) was re-opened for the start of the Nord-Ostsee-Bahn (NOB) service (now operated by Veolia Verkehr) in 2000.

Current operations 

Passenger services over the whole Husum–Kiel route have been operated since December 2011 by Deutsche Bahn with Alstom Coradia LINT 41 railcars at hourly intervals. It replaced Nord-Ostsee-Bahn (NOB) as operator. Services over the 102 kilometre-long route take 81 or 83 minutes. Trains stop at Jübek, Schleswig, Owschlag, Rendsburg and Felde.

Since January 2015, in addition to the hourly Regional-Express service, a Regionalbahn service runs hourly between Kiel and Rendsburg, which also stops in Kiel-Hassee CITTI-PARK, Kiel-Russee, Melsdorf, Achterwehr, Bredenbek  and Schülldorf. These stations were reactivated with the exception of the new Kiel-Hassee CITTI-PARK station and the  Bredenbek station which was relocated from Kronsburg. The dismantled second track from Kronsburg was rebuilt at the new station to increase the line's capacity. Only individual Regionalbahn services operate to Schleswig or Husum. The least frequented stations of Kiel-Russee and Achterwehr are request stops.

References

Footnotes

Sources

External links 
 
 
 
 

Railway lines in Schleswig-Holstein
Railway lines opened in 1854
Buildings and structures in Nordfriesland
Buildings and structures in Schleswig-Flensburg
Rendsburg-Eckernförde
Transport in Kiel